Philippe Lavigne is a French general. He was the Chief of Staff of the French Air and Space from 2018 to 2021 and the current Supreme Allied Commander Transformation HQ since 23 September 2021.

He graduated from Prytanée National Militaire in 1985 and joined the School of Air (Salon-de-Provence Air School) of which he was qualified as pilot in 1989. He served in the Mirage 2000 as a defense pilot during the operations of former Yugoslavia and of the Iraq which he flew more than 2000 flight hours, he served more than 50 combat missions and of which he was later in commands of Fighter Squadron Vendée, although he attended the Collège interarmées de Défense (Joint Defence College) to until 2000 before even commanding the Vendée. He was in charge of Operation Carbet in Haiti in 2004 and partakes in the South Asia Operation Béryx in 2005 involving local population. He was moved to Paris to serve the Paris-based Joint Strategic Planning and Command Operations Centre which he involved in several peacekeeping and humanitarian operations to until 2005 when he rose to be the planning officer of Air Force Staff, in the office which he relate with issues related to space and European cooperation. He went on to Institut des Hautes Études de Défense Nationale (Institute of Advanced Studies, National Defence) for Centre for Higher Military Studies Defence policy course to until 2009 and of the Centre des Hautes Études Militaires too, he became the Deputy Director incharge of war material exports in the General Secretariat for Defence and National Security after completing the policy course to 2012.

He served as the director of information in Armed Forces HQ in 2014 before he rose to be incharge of the French Chief of Defence's front office to until 2018, he was moved to Paris to occupied the Afghanistan Kabul International Airport through which French forces engaged in Operation Pamir of the both he supervised the formation of operations from the airport to civil authorities under the military responsibilities.

NATO
He was nominated to head the Supreme Allied Commander Transformation HQ in Norfolk, Virginia by the North Atlantic Council on 28 May 2021, and formally took over the role on 23 September 2021.

Ranks and Commands
He rose to the rank of General of the Air Brigade in 2015 followed an appointment to commands of the Air Brigade of the Aviation of hunting in Dijon and of the Bordeaux-Mérignac in September, as head combat aviation operational readiness in 2016, he was appointed to Armed Force HQ to serve as chief cabinet and later a promotion to Air major general in 2017 until he became the Chief of Staff of the Air Force which followed with a promotion to Air lieutenant general on 31 August 2018.

Personal life
General Philippe Lavigne is married to Isabella Lavigne since 2021, they have 3 children.  Lavigne has passion in rugby and live comic book.

Awards Decorations
 Commander of the Legion of Honour
 Commander of the National Order of Merit
 Officer of the Legion of Honor
 Cross for Military Valour
 Overseas Medal
 Pingat Jasa Gemilang (Tentera) Meritorious Service Medal (Military)

References

External links

1965 births
Living people
French generals